Nico Locco (born January 25, 1993) is a Canadian actor and model.

Life and career

Early beginnings 
Locco moved to the Philippines for modeling and later made minor appearances in television including Tadhana, Wagas and Daddy's Gurl. Prior to his move, he was based in California with his family.

Acting and best actor award 

In the 2019, he appeared in a non-speaking role in the South Korean film Byeonshin. He was cast next in the film Sabado. The film earned six awards in the Gawad Sining Awards including a Best Actor award for Locco. Locco became the first foreigner to win the award in the said organization and the first foreigner to win a Best Actor award in a Philippine-based film competition.  In the same year, he also played an American reporter in Rendezvous and an American soldier afflicted with leprosy in Culion.

Locco hosted the Miss Universe Philippines 2021's Final 30 Reveal, with Miss Universe Philippines 2020 4th runner-Up Billie Hakenson, in YouTube in the evening of September 1, 2021. He is set to appear in the anthology series Love at the End of the World''.

Filmography

Television

Film

Awards and nominations

References

External links
 

Living people
Canadian male film actors
Canadian male television actors
1996 births